Görbeháza is a village in Hajdú-Bihar county, in the Northern Great Plain region of eastern Hungary.

Location

It is located in the north-western part of the county, about 50 kilometres north-west of Debrecen, and a similar distance from Miskolc and Nyíregyháza.

A separate part of the municipality is Bagota, 9 km south of the centre.

The immediate neighbours are Hajdúnánás to the north-east, Hajdúböszörmény to the south-east, Balmazújváros to the south, Újszentmargita to the south-west, Folyás to the west and Polgár to the north-west.

History

The original name of Görbeháza was Görbeházpuszta, which belonged to the neighbouring settlement of Polgár. It was named after the L-shaped house there, which is called "görbeház" in this region. According to tradition, this house was a tavern on the edge of the Hortobágy puszta, frequented by shepherds and outlaws, with a large cellar, traces of which can still be seen today.

The history of the village was intertwined with the neighbouring settlement of Polgár, which was a part of the civil estate of the Eger Chapter.

According to the 1910 census, Görbeház is a bare inhabited place with 165 inhabitants. During the Nagyatád land reform, the idea of creating a settled village in Polgár was raised. The idea was motivated by the fact that the present area of Görbeháza, the estates called Nagykapros and Lipcsei-hát, which were intended for distribution anyway, were far away from Polgár (13 km) and were considered to be very unsuitable for cultivation in small pieces.

Under the land reform, a new settlement village was created in Görbeház-Puszta in 1924.

The village was actually built between 1925 and 1929, in a planned engineering layout, for which the builders received state loans.

Its population grew rapidly as new plots were allocated in 1939-1940 as a result of national land policy measures. At that time, its independence was no longer in doubt, but it was not formally granted until 1945, when it had a population of 1,638 inhabitants and was granted the status of a large municipality in that year.

The name of the municipality, which had previously been provisionally called Görbeháza, was finalised by Decree No 015.304 (12.III.1948) of the Minister of the Interior.

Geography

References

Populated places in Hajdú-Bihar County